Luc Langlois (born 1963) is a Canadian philosopher, writer, and translator. He is a professor of philosophy at Laval University. He served as the francophone editor of the journal Dialogue: Canadian Philosophical Review.

Early life and education
Luc Langlois was born in 1963 in Canada. He attended primary school and high school in Canada. He earned a bachelor in philosophy from the Laval University in 1985. He continued his studies in philosophy and received his master's in philosophy from the same university in 1986. Then, he moved to Paris and earned his Master of Advanced Studies degree from Sorbonne University (Paris IV) in 1987. He did a PhD in philosophy at the same university and received his PhD degree in philosophy in 1991. He has also a bachelor's degree in law from Laval University.

Career 
Langlois was Dean of Faculty of Philosophy at Laval University between 2002 and 2010, and again from 2018. He teaches the modern philosophy in the faculty of philosophy at Laval University. His expertise is in German modern philosophy (Leibniz, Kant, Fichte, German idealism, neo-Kantianism), critical theory (Habermas) and Heidegger.

Langlois is the co-author of Les philosophes et la question de Dieu (with Yves Charles Zarka, 2006). His books also include French translations of works by Immanuel Kant and Alexander Gottlieb Baumgarten.

Awards and honors 
Ordre des Palmes Académiques, 2006
President of the Canadian Philosophical Association, 2006–2007
Francophone editor of Dialogue: Canadian Philosophical Review, 2013–2018

References

External links
 of Luc Langlois at Laval University.

Living people
1963 births
Université Laval alumni
Chevaliers of the Ordre des Palmes Académiques
20th-century Canadian non-fiction writers
Philosophy journal editors
Academic staff of Université Laval
20th-century Canadian male writers
21st-century Canadian male writers
21st-century Canadian non-fiction writers
20th-century Canadian philosophers
21st-century Canadian philosophers
Paris-Sorbonne University alumni
Canadian male non-fiction writers
Canadian non-fiction writers in French
English–French translators
20th-century Canadian translators
21st-century Canadian translators
Place of birth missing (living people)
Presidents of the Canadian Philosophical Association